The 2016 Liga de Elite began on 15 January 2016 and ended on 12 June 2016.

Renamed Clubs

Windsor Arch Ka I were renamed Tak Chun Ka I

League table

Match results

References

External links
Macau Football Association 

Campeonato da 1ª Divisão do Futebol seasons
Macau
Macau
1